James Grady Johnson (February 5, 1940 – June 23, 2006) was an American professional wrestler, best known by his ring name, "Crazy" Luke Graham. As Luke Graham, Johnson was part of the Graham family, a stable of wrestlers. All members were billed as kayfabe brothers. He worked extensively for various National Wrestling Alliance territories as well as the World Wide Wrestling Federation, where he was a three-time tag-team champion and the inaugural WWWF World Tag Team Champion (alongside Tarzan Tyler).

Professional wrestling career
Johnson made his debut in 1961 in National Wrestling Alliance's Mid-America territory. He began his career as the Kayfabe brother of Dr. Jerry Graham after fellow wrestler Frankie Cain (The Great Mephisto) suggested that they resembled each other. They began wrestling together in 1963 in Stampede Wrestling. Starting that summer, Graham would go on to have a series of matches against Chief Big Heart.

Beginning in 1964 he started wrestling for the World Wide Wrestling Federation (WWWF) with Jerry Graham . They won the WWWF United States Tag Team Championship from Don McClarity and Argentina Apollo, holding it for eight months, before losing the belts to another heel tagteam, Gene Kiniski and Waldo Von Erich. It was during this time that he became known as "Crazy" Luke Graham. Graham left the Northeast territory after the loss and returned to the WWWF as a singles wrestler from 1966-1969; feuding with Miguel Perez, Antonio Pugliese and Bruno Sammartino.

Graham enjoyed most of his success for the Los Angeles territory in the mid to late 1960s. During this period he held the WWA World Title once in 1965 which he won by defeating future WWE champion Pedro Morales at a house show on July 23rd. He held the title for 86 days before losing it . He dropped the belt back to Pedro Morales. For rest of the 1960s, he was a mid card performer for Verne Gagne's American Wrestling Association (AWA) out of Minneapolis. Failing to find any mainstream success he departed AWA for Vince McMahon's WWWF.  

After leaving the AWA, Luke returned to WWWF and had a brief run with Tarzan Tyler as the inaugural WWWF Tag Team Champions in 1971. One story was that the team allegedly defeated Dick the Bruiser and The Sheik for the belts, however, no record of any match between the two teams has ever been documented. The other story is that they won it from Bepo and Geeto Mongol. Once champions, the team held the belts for six months while feuding with Chief Jay Strongbow, Gorilla Monsoon, and Pedro Morales. He and Tyler also went on to win the WWF International Tagteam Championship in November 1971 from Bepo and Geeto Mongol. They lost it back to the Mongols after a month. After losing the title he again left WWWF and went to on to wrestle in the Georgia territory.  

He fought in Florida as El Lobo in 1970. In 1974, he was the United States Champion in the Pacific Northeast. After that he left for Georgia Championship Wrestling where he won the NWA Georgia Heavyweight championship in a tournament on April 20. In 1978, Graham return to the WWWF this time being managed by The Grand Wizard. He had epic feuds with Andre the Giant, Dino Bravo, Haystacks Calhoun, Ivan Putski and then WWWF champion Bob Backlund. He even teamed with his "brother" Superstar Billy Graham. He retired in the late 1980s. He teamed with his son, Luke Jr., however, in 2001 and started Galaxy Championship Wrestling, Inc.

Professional wrestling style and persona 
Grady Johnson's Luke Graham persona was known for his "craziness". Whenever someone referred to him as "Crazy" Luke Graham, as part of his gimmick he would claim to be sane and cover his ears. He had bleached hair and goatee. His signature moves included the atomic drop and stabbing people with his taped thumb (which he called the "Golden Spike"). 

Graham's storyline brothers were "Doctor" Jerry Graham (Jerramiah Martin Mathews), Superstar Billy Graham (Wayne Coleman), former wrestler/promoter Eddie Graham (Eddie Gosset). Other Family members include: Tommy "T.G." Graham (William Pawlak), Troy "The Dream Machine/Warrior" Graham (Troy R. Tompson), Eddie Graham's son Mike Graham (Mike Gosset), and Luke Graham's son, "Crazy" Luke Graham Jr. (Donald J. Jolly), and nephew, Gerry "Chubby" Graham (M. Gerald Sadler). Of them Jerry, Eddie and Mike have since died.

Death 
Johnson, who had a pacemaker, died from congestive heart failure on June 23, 2006 at the age of 66.

Championships and accomplishments 
50th State Big Time Wrestling
NWA Hawaii Heavyweight Championship (1 time)
NWA Hawaii Tag Team Championship (1 time) – with Ripper Collins

Central States Wrestling
NWA Central States Heavyweight Championship (1 time)

Deep South Wrestling
DSW Brass Knuckles Championship (1 time, final)

Eastern Wrestling Association
EWA United States Brass Knuckles Championship (1 time)

Georgia Championship Wrestling
NWA Georgia Heavyweight Championship (1 time)
NWA Georgia Television Championship (1 time)
NWA Macon Tag Team Championship (1 time) – with Moondog Mayne
NWA Southeastern Heavyweight Championship (Georgia version) (1 time)
NWA Southeastern Tag Team Championship (Georgia version) (1 time) – with Al Galanto

NWA Detroit
NWA World Tag Team Championship (Detroit version) (1 time) – with Ripper Collins

NWA Mid-America
NWA Alabama Tag Team Championship (1 time) – with Ripper Collins
NWA Mid-America Heavyweight Championship (2 times)
NWA Tennessee Tag Team Championship (1 time) – with Ripper Collins
NWA World Tag Team Championship (Mid-America version) (1 time) – with Karl Von Brauner

Worldwide Wrestling Associates
WWA World Heavyweight Championship (1 time)
WWA World Tag Team Championship (1 time) – with Gorilla Monsoon

Stampede Wrestling
Stampede Wrestling International Tag Team Championship (1 time) – with Jim Wright

World Wrestling Council
WWC Caribbean Heavyweight Championship (1 time)
WWC North American Heavyweight Championship (1 time) 
WWC North American Tag Team Championship (2 times) – with Gorgeous George Jr. (1 time) and Bulldog Brower (1 time)

World Wide Wrestling Federation
WWWF International Tag Team Championship (1 time) – with Tarzan Tyler
WWWF United States Tag Team Championship (1 time) – with Dr. Jerry Graham
WWWF World Tag Team Championship (1 time, inaugural) – with Tarzan Tyler

References

External links 
 

1940 births
2006 deaths
20th-century professional wrestlers
American male professional wrestlers
NWA Americas Tag Team Champions
People from Union Point, Georgia
Professional wrestlers from Georgia (U.S. state)
Stampede Wrestling alumni
Stampede Wrestling International Tag Team Champions
NWA Macon Tag Team Champions
NWA Georgia Heavyweight Champions
NWA National Television Champions